This is a list of notable events relating to the environment in 1963. They relate to environmental law, conservation, environmentalism and environmental issues.

Events

December
 US President Lyndon B. Johnson signed the Clean Air Act of 1963.

References

1963 in the environment